Craig is a city in Plymouth County, Iowa, United States. The population was 79 at the 2020 census.

The town of Craig was incorporated in Plymouth County on April 26, 1911.

Geography
Craig is located at  (42.896324, -96.310256).

Demographics

2010 census
As of the census of 2010, there were 89 people, 37 households, and 26 families living in the city. The racial makeup of the city was 100.0% White.

There were 37 households, of which 32.4% had children under the age of 18 living with them, 56.8% were married couples living together, 8.1% had a female householder with no husband present, 5.4% had a male householder with no wife present, and 29.7% were non-families. 29.7% of all households were made up of individuals, and 10.8% had someone living alone who was 65 years of age or older. The average household size was 2.41 and the average family size was 2.85.

The median age in the city was 41.2 years. 23.6% of residents were under the age of 18; 9% were between the ages of 18 and 24; 25.8% were from 25 to 44; 30.3% were from 45 to 64; and 11.2% were 65 years of age or older. The gender makeup of the city was 52.8% male and 47.2% female.

2000 census
As of the census of 2000, there were 102 people, 43 households, and 28 families living in the city. The racial makeup of the city was 100.00% White.

There were 43 households, out of which 30.2% had children under the age of 18 living with them, 62.8% were married couples living together, 4.7% had a female householder with no husband present, and 32.6% were non-families. 30.2% of all households were made up of individuals, and 11.6% had someone living alone who was 65 years of age or older. The average household size was 2.37 and the average family size was 3.00.

In the city, the population was spread out, with 21.6% under the age of 18, 5.9% from 18 to 24, 32.4% from 25 to 44, 23.5% from 45 to 64, and 16.7% who were 65 years of age or older. The median age was 40 years. For every 100 females, there were 117.0 males. For every 100 females age 18 and over, there were 116.2 males.

The median income for a household in the city was $32,917, and the median income for a family was $42,500. Males had a median income of $30,208 versus $24,375 for females. The per capita income for the city was $17,239. None of the population and none of the families were below the poverty line.

Education
The Le Mars Community School District operates local area public schools.

References

Cities in Iowa
Cities in Plymouth County, Iowa
Populated places established in 1911